The 1996 CONCACAF Gold Cup Final was a soccer match to determine the winners of the 1996 CONCACAF Gold Cup. The match was held at the Los Angeles Memorial Coliseum in Los Angeles, United States, on January 21, 1996, and was contested by the winners of the semi-finals, Brazil and Mexico. Mexico, who had won 1993 CONCACAF Gold Cup, successfully defended their title with a 2–0 win over Brazil. As Gold Cup champions, Mexico earned a berth into the 1997 FIFA Confederations Cup in Saudi Arabia as the representative from CONCACAF.

The final was Mexico's second in Gold Cup history, while it was the Brazil's first final, and the first for a non-CONCACAF team to be invited for the tournament and make it to the final.

Route to the final

Match

References

Final
CONCACAF Gold Cup finals
CONCACAF Gold Cup Final
CONCACAF Gold Cup Final
Mexico national football team matches
Brazil national football team matches
CONCACAF Gold Cup Final
CONCACAF Gold Cup Final
CONCACAF Gold Cup Final
Exposition Park (Los Angeles neighborhood)